Urdu fiction is a narrative and imaginary work, a great work and a part of Urdu literature.

Fiction writers 

 Abdul Hameed
 Ali Akbar Natiq
 Ashfaq Ahmed
 Bano Qudsia
 Altaf Fatima
 Ibn-e-Safi
 Khan Shein Kunwar
 Mazhar Kaleem
 Mirza Hadi Ruswa
 Naseem Hijazi
 Qudrat Ullah Shahab
 Rasheed Amjad
 Rahman Abbas
 Rizwana Syed Ali
 Shaukat Thanvi
 Syed Qasim Mahmood

Urdu-language fiction writers
Urdu-language novelists